Normand Landry is a Canadian academic and professor of communication at Université TÉLUQ in Quebec, Canada. He is the current Canada Research Chair in Media Education and Human Rights.

Early life and education
Landry completed a bachelor's degree in communication and politics followed by a master's degree in communication sciences at the Université de Montréal in 2006. He then completed a Doctor of Philosophy (Ph.D.) in communication studies at McGill University before completing postdoctoral research at Concordia University in 2010.

Career
Landry has been a professor at Université TÉLUQ since 2011.

He is part of the Groupe de recherche en communication politique at Université Laval.

References

Canada Research Chairs
Living people
Academic staff of the Université du Québec
Université de Montréal alumni
McGill University alumni
Concordia University alumni
Communication scholars
Academics in Quebec
Year of birth missing (living people)